Retimohnia is a genus of sea snails, marine gastropod mollusks in the family Retimohniidae, the true whelks and the like.

Species
Species within the genus Retimohnia include:
 Retimohnia acadiana Garcia, 2008
 Retimohnia bella (Ozaki, 1958)
 Retimohnia caelata A. E. Verrill, 1880
 Retimohnia clarki (Dall, 1907)
 Retimohnia frielei (Dall, 1891)
 Retimohnia glypta (A. E. Verrill, 1882)
 Retimohnia hondoensis (Dall, 1913)
 Retimohnia lussae Kosyan & Kantor, 2016
 Retimohnia mcleani Kosyan & Kantor, 2016
 Retimohnia micra (Dall, 1907)
 Retimohnia robusta (Dall, 1913)
 Retimohnia sordida (Dall, 1907)
 Retimohnia vernalis (Dall, 1913)

Species brought into synonymy
 Retimohnia buccinoides (Dall, 1913): synonym of Retifusus buccinoides (Dall, 1913)
 Retimohnia carolinensis (A. E. Verrill, 1884): synonym of Mohnia carolinensis (Verrill, 1884)
 Retimohnia clementinus (Dall, 1919): synonym of Limatofusus clementinus (Dall, 1919)
 Retimohnia corbis (Dall, 1913): synonym of Fusipagoda corbis (Dall, 1913)
 Retimohnia daphnelloides (Okutani, 1964): synonym of Retifusus daphnelloides (Okutani, 1964)
 Retimohnia japonica (Dall, 1913): synonym of Retimohnia micra (Dall, 1907)
 Retimohnia laticingulatus (Golikov & Gulbin, 1977): synonym of Retifusus laticingulatus Golikov & Gulbin, 1977
 Retimohnia multicostata (Habe & Ito, 1965): synonym of Mohnia bella (Ozaki, 1958)
 Retimohnia olivacea (Bartsch, 1929): synonym of Retifusus olivaceus (Bartsch, 1929)
 Retimohnia robusta (Dall, 1913): synonym of Mohnia robusta Dall, 1913
 Retimohnia toyamana (Tiba, 1981): synonym of Retifusus toyamanus (Tiba, 1981)
 Retimohnia virens (Dall, 1877): synonym of Retifusus virens (Dall, 1877)

References

External links
 Kosyan A. R. & Kantor Yu. I. (2016). "Revision of the genus Retimohnia McLean, 1995 (Gastropoda: Buccinidae)". Ruthenica 26(2): 85-121

Retimohniidae
Gastropod genera